Jacques Feyerick (28 December 1874 – 13 November 1955) was a Belgian athlete, who specialised in hurdling. He won the Belgian national title in his event.

Biography

Athletics
Feyerick was born in Ghent.  He became the Belgian champion at 110 metres hurdling. He was affiliated with AA Gent.

Soccer
Feyerick was the president of AA Gent in 1912. He managed to collect the best Ghent soccer players in a mixed team, the Ghent Entente. He was only president for a short time.

Gulf
After the death of his brothers Albert Feyerick in 1919 and Ferdinand in 1920, he was responsible for the golf course of Les Buttes Blanches, the current Royal Latem Golf Club. He made sure that the members of the golf club could acquire the fields.

Private life 
Feyerick worked, together with his brothers, as an entrepreneur, in the textile sector and the sugar trade. He was married to Christine Braun, the daughter of mayor Emile Braun and he had two daughters.

Sources 
100 jaar Belgische atletiek, uitgave KBAB, 1989
Website 150 jaar KAA Gent
A century of golf in Sint-Martens-Latem 

1874 births
1955 deaths
Belgian male hurdlers
Sportspeople from Ghent